Charles Barry Jr. (1823–1900) was an English architect of the mid-late 19th century, and eldest son of Sir Charles Barry. Like his younger brother and fellow architect Edward Middleton Barry, Charles Jr. designed numerous buildings in London. He is particularly associated with works in the south London suburb of Dulwich.

Charles Jr. worked extensively on projects in London and East Anglia with fellow architect Robert Richardson Banks (1812–72), working from an office in Sackville Street, and then collaborated with his shorter-lived brother Edward on several schemes.

Projects

Charles Sr. had been architect and surveyor to Dulwich College, designing the Grammar School, among other buildings. Charles Jr. then succeeded his father in the role. He designed the New College (1866–70) – a building of red brick and white stone, designed in a hybrid of Palladian and Gothic styles.

His other projects include:

 The Cliff Town Estate, Southend, Essex (with Banks)
 Bylaugh Hall, Norfolk (1849–1852, with Banks)
 The Pump House in the Italian Gardens, Hyde Park/Kensington Gardens, (1860, with Banks)
 St Saviour's Church, Harome (1861-1862)
 The Crystal Palace (High Level) railway station (1863-1865, demolished 1961) and the surviving Crystal Palace Subway
 The forecourt of Burlington House (home of the Royal Academy), in Piccadilly, including the apartments of the Geological Society of London, Linnean Society of London, Royal Astronomical Society, Royal Society of Chemistry, and Society of Antiquaries of London (1869–73, with Banks).
 St Stephen's Church, south Dulwich (1867–75)
Stevenstone House, Devon (1868–72)
Mausoleum of Wynn Ellis, Whitstable (1872)
All Saints Church, Whitstable, rebuilding (1875–76)
Clumber Park, Nottinghamshire, (1879)
 Chancel and pulpit of St Peter's Church, Kensington Park Road, London (1879)
 New chambers at Inner Temple, London (1879; with Edward)
 Great Eastern Hotel, Liverpool Street station, London (1884; the design was a collaboration with his brother Edward who died in 1880 before it was finished)
 Dulwich Park (1884)

Charles Jr. was elected a Fellow of the Society of Antiquaries of London in 1876, and was a member of the Society's Council in 1878. He was President of the Royal Institute of British Architects from 1876-79. He was also awarded the prestigious RIBA Royal Gold Medal in 1877. His pupils included Sir Aston Webb (himself a later President of the RIBA and winner of the Royal Gold Medal).

Family
He lived in a large villa "Lapsewood" in Sydenham Hill. His son was Lt Col Arthur John Barry CBE, TD, MICE (b. 21 November 1859), civil engineer and architect. A. J. Barry collaborated on major international engineering projects with his uncle, Charles Jr.'s brother John Wolfe-Barry, and Bradford Leslie and was the author of "Railway Expansion in China and the Influence of Foreign Powers in its Development" [London, 1910].

References

1823 births
1900 deaths
Recipients of the Royal Gold Medal
Presidents of the Royal Institute of British Architects
19th-century English architects
Charles Jr.